Dubai Creek Tower is a building in Dubai, United Arab Emirates (UAE).  Located along the Dubai Creek, the Dubai Creek Tower is situated in eastern Dubai, in Deira.  The building, constructed in 1995, is part of the old Dubai downtown along the Dubai Creek, and was the second-tallest building in Dubai, at the time of its construction (behind the Dubai World Trade Centre).  From Bur Dubai, the building appears to the right of the Dubai Chamber of Commerce and Industry building.  The Dubai Creek Tower is situated in the locality of Rigga Al Buteen.

References 

Buildings and structures in Dubai